State Route 732 (SR 732) is a state highway in the U.S. state of Ohio. This two-lane state route begins at SR 129 (Hamilton-Scipio Road) in Butler County, and extends northward to end at the junction of U.S. Route 127 (US 127) and US 35/SR 122 in Eaton in Preble County, Ohio, traveling .

This route gives access from northern and western Ohio via Interstate 70 (I-70) or US 127 to Miami University in Oxford and Hueston Woods State Park. It also passes the historic Fort St. Clair.

Route description
In Reily, it turns east for a block and then continues north crossing Indian Creek as it leaves Reily as Oxford-Reily Road. SR 732 ascends a steep hill near Indian Creek Park. SR 732 continues north past a sharp bend as it leaves the creek and ascends to the flashing caution light as it crosses Stillwell-Becket Road with the water tower at the southwest corner of this intersection. SR 732 continues north through farm fields on a straight road passing Talawanda Middle School on the east side of the road.

SR 732 reaches the southwest corner of Oxford at the intersection of Oxford-Reily Road with West Chestnut Street. Chestnut Street is also known as Brookville Road. SR 732 turns eastbound on Chestnut Street and passes a traffic signal at South Locust Street, continuing east to the north end of Kehr Road. When SR 732 meets College Street, it passes the Talawanda Board of Education and Talawanda High School. SR 732 turns left on Main Street proceeding north and uphill to the traffic light on US 27 (High Street). Miami University is a few blocks east on High Street. SR 732 continues on Main Street northbound past the Presbyterian Church and McCullough-Hyde Hospital leaving Oxford and passing the historic Black Covered Bridge over Talawanda Creek.

Just north of the county line is the east entrance to Hueston Woods State Park. A bit north of the park entrance is Oxford-Eaton Road (Preble County Road 29) which runs past the ODOT facility to join SR 177 northwestward to Morning Sun. SR 732 continues concurrent with SR 177 until a bit north of Morning Sun, where SR 732 continues due north crossing SR 725. SR 732 continues to jog east and north past Lakengren to meet US 127 at a traffic light in the south side of Eaton, the county seat of Preble County. One mile before the US 127 intersection is Eaton High School.

According to ODOT District 8, the number of vehicles carried is between 660 and 5,270 vehicles a day, depending on the section.
The 2010 Preble County Traffic Survey shows that the 10 mile segment of highway ending at U.S. 35 in Eaton had an average traffic volume of 4700 vehicles in a 24-hour period.

History

The first military road in Butler County was built in 1791 by General Arthur St. Clair from Cincinnati to Hamilton and continuing north to the fortifications at Eaton. In 1794 General Anthony Wayne constructed a road north from Fort Hamilton a few miles east of St. Clair's road, giving rise to the long multi-county road "Wayne Trace".

Eaton Road (future SR 732) is clearly marked on McBride's Map of Oxford Township of 1836. The land and overshot mill of the Austins is also marked where Eaton Road crosses Talawanda Creek. Aaron Austin whose 1816 homestead is still near the Black Covered Bridge operated the Mill here on Talawanda Creek. The mill eventually passed into the hands of Pugh and the Austin land passed into the hands of a successful swine breeder, David Magie, a contributor to the Poland China Hog. The covered bridge was called Black by local people to distinguish it from the white painted bridge one mile (1.6 km) downstream which carried the traffic of the future SR 73.

The enumeration of Ohio State Routes began in 1924, but was adjusted by the 1926–27 effort of the Federal Government to do the same. Added to the system in 1938, SR 732 was the longest of four Butler County routes to be designated by number that year. The Butler County Engineers Office indicates that SR732 was rerouted in 1951 to use the current bridge crossing Talawanda Creek a few hundred feet east of the Black Bridge.  There being no other bridge piers in evidence shows that the Black Bridge carried SR 732 until 1951.

The precursor to SR 732 between Oxford and Eaton was laid out in March 1811. The road began on the Great Miami River at Derrough's Ford, proceeding north to Oxford and then on to Eaton. 

The Black Covered Bridge spanning Talawanda Creek just north of the Oxford City limits was constructed in 1868. The bridge was renovated in 1998 and can be viewed by the passerby from the current SR 732 bridge by looking upstream (west). It is exceeded in length by only a few Ohio covered bridges. Built by Bandin, Butin and Bowman in 1868 and 1869, it incorporates both the truss style of Childs and that of Long in one bridge. In 1869 a stone pier was added as a support beneath  the center of the bridge. The bow in the bridge was removed by replacing some wooden cross members with threaded iron rods. The nuts at the ends of these were loosened so that the bow was straightened and the middle  of the bridge was lowered onto the pier. The bridge is so named to distinguish it from the white bridge east of Oxford and was useful in servicing Pugh's Mill at the time of construction. The Butler County Engineers Office-BCEO indicates that SR732 was rerouted in 1951 to use the current bridge crossing Talawanda Creek a few hundred feet east of the Black Bridge. There being no other bridge piers in evidence shows that the Black Bridge carried SR732 until 1951.

Major intersections

Sources

External links

732
Transportation in Butler County, Ohio
Transportation in Preble County, Ohio